Moon of Israel is a novel by English writer H. Rider Haggard, first published in 1918 by John Murray. The novel narrates the events of the Biblical Exodus from Egypt told from the perspective of a scribe named Ana.
 
Haggard dedicated his novel to Sir Gaston Maspero, a distinguished Egyptologist and director of Cairo Museum.

Adaptation
His novel was the basis of a script by Ladislaus Vajda, for film-director Michael Curtiz in his  1924 Austrian  epic known  as Die Sklavenkönigin, or "Queen of the Slaves".

References

External links
 

1918 British novels
1918 fantasy novels
Novels by H. Rider Haggard
Novels based on the Bible
Book of Exodus
British novels adapted into films